Twin of Brothers is a 2011 Chinese wuxia television series directed by prolific Hong Kong film director Wong Jing adapted from Huang Yi's novel of the same Chinese title. The series stars Hong Kong actors Danny Chan and Alex Fong as the "Twin Dragons", Kou Zhong and Xu Zhiling respectively. Executive producer Tie Fo stated this series will the first in a trilogy in order to fully explore Huang's novel. The series aired on CCTV-1 from 8 to 30 August 2011.

Cast
Danny Chan as Kou Zhong (寇仲)
Alex Fong as Xu Zhiling (徐子陵)
Athena Chu as Fu Junzhuo / Fu Junyu (傅君婥/傅君瑜)
You Yong as Yuwen Huafan (宇文化及)
Kong Lin as Zhen Sao (貞嫂)
Cherrie Ying as Li Xiuning (李秀寧)
Wu Qingzhe as Li Shimin (李世民)
Zheng Xiaodong as Song Shidao (宋師道)
Li Jiajia as Shi Feixuan (師妃暄)
Xu Jiaoning as Zhai Jiao (翟嬌)
Si Guangmin as Song Yuzhi (宋玉致)
Tian Leixi as Guaguan (婠婠)
Little Wong Jing as Shen Luoya (沈落雁)
Ge Xiaofeng as Susu (素素)
Jiang Yuqing as Xian Yuanjing (單婉晶)
Li Haokui as Arms Sponsor (軍火供應商)
Kao Hu as Sui Yangdi (隋煬帝)
Wang Jiusheng as Qin Shubao (秦叔寶)
Pang Guochang as Eunuch Xiao (蕭公公)
Shi Mingjiao as Caishao (柴紹)
Hu Ke as Shuang Xiuxun (商秀珣)

See also
Twin of Brothers

References

2011 Chinese television series debuts
2011 Chinese television series endings
Chinese wuxia television series
Television series set in the Sui dynasty
Television shows based on Chinese novels
Adaptations of works by Huang Yi